Syria is one of Asia's stronger teams, and has been a major participant in the AFC Asian Cup with six appearances in the tournament, in 1980, 1984, 1988, 1996, 2011, and 2019. However, Syria have failed to make the second round of the tournament, being eliminated in the group stage in all six editions they participated in.

Syria have never qualified past the group stage in the Asian Cup, with them narrowly missing out on the knock-out stage in 1980 and knock-out stage in 1996 due to 1 missed point; both eliminations involved China national football team.

AFC Asian Cup record

1980 Kuwait

Group A

1984 Singapore

Group A

1988 Qatar

Group B

1996 United Arab Emirates

Group C

2011 Qatar

Group B

2019 United Arab Emirates

Group B

Overall record

Record by opponent

Record results

Goalscorers

Only players with minimum 2 goals scored

References

Countries at the AFC Asian Cup
AFC